The Hunnic invasion of the Sasanian Empire was a 395 AD invasion by the Huns, which coincided with an invasion of the neighbouring Roman provinces.

Background
In 395 the Huns, led by led by commanders Basiq and Kursich, crossed the Don and turning southeast crossed the Caucasus. Initially, the Huns invaded the Roman regions of Sophene, Armenia, Mesopotamia, and Syria, capturing and enslaving Roman subjects. The Huns then besieged the Roman fortress of Ziatha, burning it and killing and enslaving its inhabitants. The two contingents then proceeded into Persia proper.

Invasion
Basiq and Kursich led two detachments down the Euphrates, threatening the capital Ctesiphon. Upon hearing that the Sasanian army was marching against them, the Huns retreated. However, one group was overtaken, and some were killed. The Sasanians took nearly all of the booty, and freed 18,000 captives. The other group of Huns successfully retreated through the Derbent Pass.

Aftermath
Years later, the Sasanian Emperor Yazdegerd I returned the Roman prisoners taken by the Huns.

References

Sources

4th-century conflicts
395
Huns
Wars involving the Sasanian Empire
4th century in Iran